Tamarou can refer to:

tamaraw, a small hoofed mammal
dahu, an imaginary animal